Tetradactylus breyeri, commonly known as Breyer's long-tailed seps or Breyer's whip lizard, is a species of lizard in the family Gerrhosauridae.
The species is endemic to South Africa.

Etymology
The specific name, breyeri, is in honor of Dutch naturalist Hermann Gottfried Breyer.

Geographic range
T. breyeri is found in the South African provinces of Free State, KwaZulu-Natal, and Mpumalanga.

Habitat

Description
T. breyeri is snake-like, with short vestigial legs. There are two toes on each front foot, and one toe on each back foot. The tail is very long, more than three times SVL.

Reproduction
T. breyeri is oviparous. Clutch size is small, only one or two eggs laid in early summer.

References

Further reading
Bates MF (1996). "Taxonomic status and distribution of the South African lizard Tetradactylus breyeri Roux (Gerrhosauridae)". South African Journal of Zoology 31 (4): 214–218.
Berger-Dell'Mour HAE (1983). "Der Übergang von Echse zu Schleiche in der Gattung Tetradactylus, Merrem ". Zoologische Jahrbücher. Abteilung für Anatomie und Ontogenie der Tiere. 110: 1–152. (in German).
FitzSimons VF (1943). The Lizards of South Africa. Transvaal Museum Memoirs No. 1. Pretoria: Transvaal Museum. xvi + 528 pp. (Teteradactylus breyeri, p. 294).
Roux J (1907). "Beiträge zur Kenntnis der Fauna von Süd-Afrika. Ergebnisse einer Reise von Prof. Max Weber im Jahre 1894. VII. Lacertilia (Eidechsen) ". Zoologische Jarhrbücher. Abteilung für Systematik, Geographie und Biologie der Tiere. 25: 403–444. (Tetradactylus breyeri, new species, pp. 430–431 + Plate 14, figure 6). (in German).

Tetradactylus
Endemic reptiles of South Africa
Reptiles described in 1907
Taxa named by Jean Roux
Taxonomy articles created by Polbot
Fauna of South Africa
Endemic fauna of South Africa